Maharaja Sir Sumer Singh   (14 January 1898 – 3 October 1918)  was Maharaja of Jodhpur from 20 March 1911 to 3 October 1918, succeeding his father, Maharaja Sardar Singh.

Life
Sumer Singh was born on 14 January 1898 at Mehrangarh, Jodhpur, the eldest son of Maharaja Sir Sardar Singh, GCSI by his first wife, the Maharani Shri Lakhsman Kanwarji Maji Sahiba. In March 1911 at the age of 13, he succeeded to the Jodhpur gadi upon the death of his father, and served as a page of honour to George V at the Delhi Durbar that year.

Educated at Mayo College, Ajmer and Wellington College in Berkshire, he reigned for five years under the regency of his great-uncle General Maharaja Sir Pratap Singh of Idar, who had abdicated his throne at Idar in order to oversee the Jodhpur regency.

Wartime service
Upon the outbreak of the First World War, the young Maharaja volunteered to serve in combat and was commissioned as an honorary Lieutenant in the British Army in October 1914. On 26 February 1916, a month after he had come of age, Sumer Singh was granted full ruling powers by the Viceroy, Lord Hardinge, in person. Shortly after, he left India for the battlefields of the Western Front, leading the Jodhpur Imperial Service Lancers in combat in France and Flanders. He was promoted to the rank of an honorary Major in the British Army in 1917. For his services, Sumer Singh was decorated and subsequently knighted as a Knight Commander of the Order of the British Empire (KBE) in 1918.

Personal
On 9 December 1915, Sumer Singh married Pratapha Kanwarji Maji Sahiba, the daughter of Kumar Jivansinhji Jhalamsinhji Sahib of Sarodar, a branch of the Nawanagar royal family, and the sister of cricketer Ranjitsinhji. He married secondly, on 23 May 1918, Umrao Kanwarji Sahiba (d. 30 November 1949), the daughter of Thakur Shri Suraj Malji, of Sointra, under Jodhpur Marwar.

By his first wife, Sumer Singh had one daughter:
Maharajkumari Shri Kishor Kumariji Baijilal Sahiba [H.H. Maharani Shri Kishor Kumari Sahiba, of Jaipur] ["Jo Didi"] (Mehrangarh, Jodhpur, 20 September 1916 – Rambagh Palace, Jaipur, 30 April 1958)  who m. at Mehrangarh, Jodhpur, 24 April 1932, as his second wife, Maharaja Sawai Man Singh II of Jaipur, Maharaja of Jaipur

Death
The Maharaja returned to Jodhpur in early 1918, but died on 3 October from pneumonia at the Ratanada Palace. He was cremated at Mehrangarh. As he had only left a daughter at his death, he was succeeded by his younger brother Umaid Singh.

Honours

British
1911 Delhi Durbar medal in gold
1914 Star (with August - November 1914 clasp)
British War Medal
Victory Medal
Knight Commander of the Order of the British Empire, (KBE) - awarded 1918

Foreign
Grand Cordon of the Order of the Nile of Egypt-1918

References

Monarchs of Marwar
British Army General List officers
Indian Knights Commander of the Order of the British Empire
1898 births
1918 deaths
British Army personnel of World War I
Deaths from pneumonia in India